James R. Barnett, Sr., (May 31, 1842January 20, 1917) was an American medical doctor, banker, and Republican politician.  He served two years in the Wisconsin State Assembly, representing northern Winnebago County.

Biography
Barnett was born on May 31, 1842, in the town of Pewaukee, in what is now Waukesha County, Wisconsin. As a young man, he moved to Fond du Lac County, Wisconsin, and taught school there for two years before the outbreak of the American Civil War.

In the summer of 1862, he volunteered for service in the Union Army and was enlisted as a private in Company I of the 1st Wisconsin Cavalry Regiment.  He served with the regiment through the rest of the war, receiving promotions to sergeant and first sergeant.  As the regiment was mustering out in July 1865, he was named 1st lieutenant, but was never officially mustered at that rank.

After the war, Barnett attended Rush Medical College and graduated in 1868.  He subsequently moved to Neenah, Wisconsin, where he practiced medicine for 45 years.

In addition to his medical practice, Barnett was superintendent of schools, a member of the Neenah board of education, dean of the local medical fraternity, president of the state medical society, and president of the Neenah State Bank.

He was elected to one term in the Wisconsin State Assembly, in 1908, running on the Republican ticket.  He was not a candidate for re-election in 1910.

He died at his home in Neenah on January 20, 1917, after an illness of one month.

Personal life and family
Barnett married Emma G. Scribner shortly after graduating from medical school.  They had at least two children.  Their son, James Jr., also became a medical doctor in Neenah.

Electoral history

| colspan="6" style="text-align:center;background-color: #e9e9e9;"| General Election, November 8, 1908

References

External links

Barnett House at Wisconsin Historical Society

People from Pewaukee, Wisconsin
People from Fond du Lac County, Wisconsin
Politicians from Neenah, Wisconsin
Republican Party members of the Wisconsin State Assembly
School superintendents in Wisconsin
School board members in Wisconsin
People of Wisconsin in the American Civil War
Union Army officers
Physicians from Wisconsin
Schoolteachers from Wisconsin
Rush Medical College alumni
1842 births
1917 deaths
19th-century American politicians